Sagay Marine Reserve is a protected area in the Philippines located in Sagay, Negros Occidental. It is established in 1999 to protect marine life in Carbin and Maca reefs. Sagay is the largest marine reserve in the Philippines, covering an area of 32,000 hectares.

References

See also

Daytrip to Carbin Reef 
List of protected areas of the Philippines

Protected areas established in 1999
Marine reserves of the Philippines
Geography of Negros Occidental
Tourist attractions in Negros Occidental
1999 establishments in the Philippines